Juan Ángel Seguro Rodríguez (born 19 January 1984) is a Mexican former professional footballer who played as a midfielder. He also held Spanish citizenship.

Football career
Born in Mexico City, Seguro made his debuts with CA Osasuna, joining its youth ranks from his homeland. During the 2003–04 season he first appeared with the first team and in La Liga, coming on as a late substitute at home against Albacete Balompié (1–1 draw on 18 January 2004) and FC Barcelona (2–1 loss, 8 February); during his spell in Navarre he was mainly registered with the reserves and also coincided with countryman Javier Aguirre, who had been coaching the main squad since 2002.

In 2006, Seguro signed with Basque neighbours Real Unión, helping the Irun club return to the second division in his third year but being rarely used in the following – only one quarter of the matches – in an immediate relegation back. He returned to the third level in summer 2010, joining AD Ceuta.

Late into the 2013 winter transfer window, after a further one-and-a-half seasons with Unión, Seguro moved to Germany and joined Regionalliga Nord side SC Victoria Hamburg. After only a few months, however, he returned to his country of adoption and signed for Sestao River Club.

Seguro returned to Navarre on 25 July 2014, joining amateurs CD Izarra. Roughly a year later, he moved to UCD Burladés also in the fourth tier.

References

External links

1984 births
Living people
Mexican people of Spanish descent
Footballers from Mexico City
Mexican footballers
Association football midfielders
La Liga players
Segunda División players
Segunda División B players
Tercera División players
CA Osasuna B players
CA Osasuna players
Real Unión footballers
SC Victoria Hamburg players
AD Ceuta footballers
Sestao River footballers
CD Izarra footballers
Mexican expatriate footballers
Mexican expatriate sportspeople in Spain
Expatriate footballers in Spain
Mexican expatriate sportspeople in Germany
Expatriate footballers in Germany